Xinhua Township is a township in Fuchuan Yao Autonomous County, Guangxi, China.

Etymology
The name of "Xinhua" means "New China".

Administrative division
As of 2016, the township is divided into one community and ten villages: 
 Xinhua Community
 Dongwan
 Xinhua
 Jingwan
 Panba
 Lianshantang
 Pingyuan
 Luping
 Xianfeng
 Luxi
 Longji

History
It was incorporated as a township in 1984.

Geography
The township is located in eastern Fuchuan Yao Autonomous County. It borders Fuli Town in the north, Jianghua Yao Autonomous County in the east, Baisha Town in the south, and Fuyang Town in the west.

Economy
The township's economy is based on agriculture. Significant crops include grains, corn, peanut, sweet potato, and pepper. Commercial crops include tobacco and vegetables.

Transportation
The County Road X723 passes across the town.

References

Bibliography

Townships of Hezhou